Kåre Siem (8 June 1914 – 23 June 1986) was a Norwegian musician and writer.

Early and personal life
Siem was born in Kristiania, to Sverre Julius Siem and Elida Annette Antonsen. He was married to Evy Christophersen from 1942 to 1959, and to dancer Alice Mürer from 1960.

Career
Siem studied piano with Nils Larsen, Erling Westher and Ivar Johnsen. He made his concert debut as pianist in 1938, and toured widely in Norway and internationally until his playing career was interrupted by an injured elbow. He started writing music for film and theatre, worked as kapellmeister and conductor, contributed to the Norwegian Broadcasting Corporation, and was a columnist for the newspaper VG. His publications further include the cookbook Kåres nam-nam-bok for kløner og duster (1974) and the memoir books Bingo (1978) and Klokkene ringer for meg (1979).

He died in Oslo on 23 June 1986. A bust of Siem, sculpted by Per Palle Storm, is located in Oslo.

References

1914 births
1986 deaths
Musicians from Oslo
Norwegian male pianists
Norwegian composers
Norwegian conductors (music)
Norwegian food writers
Norwegian memoirists
Norwegian columnists
20th-century memoirists
20th-century Norwegian male musicians
Writers from Oslo